Carmen Peter Pignatiello (born September 12, 1982) is a former Major League Baseball relief pitcher and independent league pitching coach. He is a graduate of Providence Catholic High School in New Lenox, Illinois. He is currently working as an insurance agent in Illinois.

Professional career

Minor league career
In , he led the Florida State League with a career-high 140 strikeouts in 156.1 innings for the Daytona Cubs.

Major league career
Pignatiello was called up by the Cubs on August 14, 2007, due to the need for left-handed relievers in the bullpen. Two days later, he made his major league debut against the Cincinnati Reds and pitched one scoreless inning of relief of a 12-4 victory.
In March, 2009 Carmen was signed to a minor league contract with the Minnesota Twins. Then released by the Twins, Pignatiello signed with the Schaumburg Flyers for the 2009 season as a starter, which saw him have a less-than-stellar season, going 6-9 in 20 starts with a 5.87 ERA. Following the season, Pignatiello retired.

Coaching career
On February 16, 2011, Pignatiello signed a contract with the Joliet Slammers to be their pitching coach.

Life After baseball
Pignatiello is currently working as a Nationwide insurance agent in Palos Heights, Illinois.

Personal life
He is married, and has two sons. The Pignatiello family lives in Geneva, Illinois.

References

External links

1982 births
Living people
Chicago Cubs players
Baseball players from Indiana
Major League Baseball pitchers
Arizona League Cubs players
Boise Hawks players
Lansing Lugnuts players
Daytona Cubs players
West Tennessee Diamond Jaxx players
Iowa Cubs players
Tennessee Smokies players
Rochester Red Wings players
Schaumburg Flyers players
People from Geneva, Illinois